David Berset Berget (born 30 September 1988) is a Norwegian film director and screenwriter. He is the former owner of the production company Fratres Films where he produced commercials and fiction films.

Berget was born in Oslo. He received his education at the American Film Institute where he studied directing.

His short film The Fratres (2011) was selected by Danny Lennon to screen in a special program under The 64th annual Cannes Film festival.

In 2014, he was contracted to write a film or TV series about the fictional archeologist Bjørn Beltø.

He currently lives in Los Angeles, California.

References

Norwegian film directors
1988 births
Living people
Norwegian expatriates in the United States